The Kulturhalle Zenith (also known as the Zenith Halle or simply Zenith) is an events hall located in the Schwabing-Freimann borough of Munich, Germany. Originally opening in 1918 as a part of a railway repair shop, the hall was converted into performance venue in 1994. Since its opening in August 1996, it has hosted concerts, fairs and company presentations.

History
The venue was built in 1918 as Halle 5 of the Ausbesserungswerk München-Freimann. Used as a railway construction and reparation hall, the venue faced massive damage during World War II. The hall reopened in 1927, becoming a boiling shop for locomotives. The shop remained in operation until 1992. It was sold by Deutsche Bahn to local entrepreneur Wolfgang Nöth. In 1994, Nöth began converting the space into a performance venue. The space, now known as Kulturhalle Zenith, opened August 1996. The venue can hold nearly 6,000 guests.

Noted performers

Bullet for my valentine
Motörhead
Lana Del Rey
Muse
Gorillaz
Katy Perry
Lady Gaga
Lepa Brena
Nick Cave and the Bad Seeds
Macklemore
Adele
The Prodigy
Moderat
Paul Kalkbrenner
Rag'n'Bone Man
The Script
Alexander Marcus
Emil Bulls
Beginner
Wanda
Pink
Fall Out Boy
Blumentopf
Robin Schulz
Kollegah
Rihanna
Joss Stone
No Doubt
257ers
Kraftklub
Marteria
Clueso
Queens of the Stone Age
Parov Stelar
Casper
OneRepublic
Kylie Minogue
Jack White
Rita Ora
As I Lay Dying
Oasis
Lewis Capaldi
Holly Humberstone

Notable events
 2018 German Darts Grand Prix
 2019 German Darts Grand Prix
 2022 German Darts Grand Prix

References

Buildings and structures in Munich
Music venues in Munich
Music venues completed in 1996
Theatres in Munich
Music in Munich